Bazincourt-sur-Saulx (literally Bazincourt on Saulx) is a commune in the Meuse department in the Grand Est region in northeastern France.

Population

See also
Communes of the Meuse department

References

Communes of Meuse (department)